Melanoplus montanus, known generally as the Montana short-wing grasshopper or Montana spur-throat grasshopper, is a species of spur-throated grasshopper in the family Acrididae. It is found in North America.

References

Further reading

 
 

Melanoplinae